Quintus Fabius Ambustus may refer to several ancient Romans, including:

 Quintus Fabius Ambustus, consul 412 BC; see Fabius Ambustus 
 Quintus Fabius Ambustus (tribune), consular tribune in 390 BCE
 Quintus Fabius Ambustus (dictator), dictator in 321 BCE